Hampton Yount (rhyming with "blunt"; born June 14, 1984) is an American stand-up comedian, writer, and actor, known for Mystery Science Theater 3000. 

Yount was born in Warrenton, Virginia, to Renee and Victor Yount. Hampton has three siblings, Virginia, Henri and Clay, whom he has talked about on his podcast, Y'all Ever. Clay also appeared on "Doom Island", another one of Hampton's several podcasts, in April 2021. From 2004 to 2012, he and his brother Clay produced a webcomic, Rob and Elliot, for the Boxcar Comics collective. His brother, Clay, continues to make comics and publish them on his website. He first performed stand-up comedy in Blacksburg, Virginia and Washington, D.C., before moving to Los Angeles.
 

Podcasts

Hampton currently hosts multiple podcasts, including Doom Island, Y'all Ever,which Hampton paused in March 2021. He also hosted Suicide Buddies, which is no longer running. Yount currently records Y'all Ever with Dave Ross, who is a Los Angeles comedian. On Y'all Ever, Hampton and Dave talk about current events, Hampton's neighbors, and stories sent in by listeners. Doom Island is a podcast hosted by Hampton alone, though he does invite guests. Doom Island has some acting aspects, as Yount pretends to be stranded on an island with 'Doom Bots', fictional characters of Yount's creation. Suicide buddies is a podcast co-hosted by Hampton, but also co-hosted by Dave Ross. On Suicide Buddies, Hampton and Dave read a suicide story from history on each episode. Yount has been featured on a number of comedy podcasts including Pete Holmes' You Made It Weird with Pete Holmes and Doug Benson's Getting Doug with High. Yount received his own half-hour Comedy Central special in 2015.

Acting Career

His first experience in television was as a consulting producer and performer on MTV's Ridiculousness. Yount has been featured on Conan, Last Comic Standing and Comedy Central's The Meltdown with Jonah and Kumail. In 2015, Yount was selected by Joel Hodgson to provide the voice of Crow T. Robot on the revived Mystery Science Theater 3000 Netflix series.  Yount's selection came at the recommendation of new host Jonah Ray. The role was previously played by Trace Beaulieu and Bill Corbett. Yount was also the lead role in a pilot titled "Man of Truth". The pilot was not picked up, "...probably because it was very stupid.", Yount said on his twitter page. 

Personal Life

Hampton talks about his childhood on Y'all Ever, one of his podcasts, and also Alison Rosen is Your New Best Friend. On these podcasts, Hampton talks about traumatizing teachers and being the son of a gem dealer. Hampton married Georgea Brooks, a comedian and actor. He currently resides in Sun Valley, CA. Yount currently has one son, whose name he has chosen not to release. He announced this on his Instagram page, and his wife frequently posts pictures of the baby.  Hampton also did a comedy sketch on "The Meltdown with Jonah and Kumail" about him raising a child strictly Jewish. Clay Yount, Hampton's brother, has children, which means Hampton is an uncle. Hampton's parents divorced, a topic he has talked about on his podcast "Y'all Ever". He has a mother, a father, and a stepdad. This was confirmed on the pilot for "Man of Truth". Yount currently has an artist page on Spotify, Pandora and SoundCloud, among others. His comedy trilogy albums, Unbearable, Bearable, and Able, are available to purchase on his website. Yount also owns a cat, Jojo, who has since died. 
Clay Yount, Hampton's brother, has children, which means Hampton is an uncle. Hampton's parents divorced, a topic he has talked about on his podcast "Y'all Ever". He has a mother, a father, and a stepdad. This was confirmed on the pilot for "Man of Truth". Yount currently has an artist page on Spotify, Pandora and SoundCloud, among others. His comedy trilogy albums, Unbearable, Bearable, and Able, are available to purchase on his website.

References

External links 
 
 Official site
 https://starburns.audio/podcasts/suicide-buddies/

American male television actors
American stand-up comedians
American television writers
American male television writers
1984 births
Living people
People from Virginia
21st-century American comedians
21st-century American screenwriters
21st-century American male writers